Lý Thái Tổ (HQ-012) is a  (Gepard 3.9 type) in the Vietnam People's Navy. She was built by the Zelenodolsk shipyard in Russia under signed contract to the Vietnamese Navy.

Design and description
Lý Thái Tổ is designed to perform searches, track and destroy floating target ships, air defense, anti-submarine (limited), escort, and patrol territorial waters and special areas with economic rights. Lý Thái Tổ can enter combat independently or in squadrons, and is equipped with stealth technology, to present a minimum presence on enemy radar screens.

Vietnam and Russia signed a contract worth US$350 million to build two Gepard-class frigates designed by the Institute ZPKB in Zelenodolsk.

According to the manufacturer, Lý Thái Tổs interior has been modified to increase crew comfort, improved compared to Đinh Tiên Hoàng – the previous Gepard 3.9 in Vietnam People's Navy. She has more convenient maintenance and operation, improved seaworthiness, higher maneuverability, and is better able to handle a range of situations.

Construction and career
Lý Thái Tổ, launched on 16 March 2011, was named after Lý Thái Tổ, the Đại Việt emperor and founder of the Lý dynasty, who reigned from 1009 AD to 1028 AD.

Lý Thái Tổ visited Indonesia from 12 to 15 November, Brunei from 19 to 21 November and the Philippines from 24 to 26 November 2014.

References

2011 ships
Gepard-class frigates of the Vietnam People's Navy